is a Japanese former freestyle swimmer. She competed in the women's 4 × 100 metre freestyle relay at the 1972 Summer Olympics.

References

External links
 

1954 births
Living people
Olympic swimmers of Japan
Swimmers at the 1972 Summer Olympics
Place of birth missing (living people)
Asian Games medalists in swimming
Asian Games bronze medalists for Japan
Swimmers at the 1970 Asian Games
Medalists at the 1970 Asian Games
Japanese female freestyle swimmers
20th-century Japanese women